Ulens kvintett was a Norwegian gammaldansgroup, who came from Sel og Folldal. The name is the leader of the orchestra's last name.

Crew 
 Øystein Ulen - accordion
 Kjell Grothe - accordion
 Jan Moen - accordion
 Arild Plassen - violin
 Magne Bø - violin
 Olav Juvshoel - violin
 Even Svelstad - violin
 Jan Haugstulen - guitar
 Øyvind Grindstuen - bass guitar/contrabass

NB! This is a summary of all the crew, in the band's history. This is not the group at one time.

Discography 
Elvesøg (1987)
Lugume leikje (1988)
Selsbrure (1991)
Gjensynsglede (2002)

Achievements 
1986 Gold at "Landsfestivalen i Gamaldansmusikk", Førde
1987 Gold at "Landsfestivalen i Gamaldansmusikk", Heimdal
1988 Gold at "Landsfestivalen i Gamaldansmusikk", Vinstra
1991 Silver at "Landsfestivalen i Gamaldansmusikk", Vågå
''1992 Gold at "Landsfestivalen i Gamaldansmusikk", Geilo

Norwegian musical groups